The second season of the American ABC fantasy-drama series Once Upon a Time was announced on May 10, 2012. It premiered on September 30, 2012, and concluded on May 12, 2013. 

The season's plot follows the breaking of the curse and the introduction of magic by Rumplestiltskin/Mr. Gold into Storybrooke in the first season finale, with the characters having to deal with their dual identities and new emerging threats. Existing fictional characters introduced to the series during the season include Captain Killian "Hook" Jones, Princess Aurora, Mulan, Prince Phillip, Robin Hood, the Darling family and the Lost Boys.

Premise
With the curse broken, the residents of Storybrooke struggle with resolving their original and cursed memories, left wondering about the fate of their land. When Rumpelstiltskin/Mr. Gold successfully introduces magic into the world, some of the Storybrooke residents try to figure out how to return home, leading to an incident with the Mad Hatter's teleporting hat that causes Emma and Snow White/Mary Margaret to be accidentally transported to the Enchanted Forest. They discover that part of the realm was spared from the curse, keeping the remaining inhabitants frozen during the twenty-eight years. Among them are allies Aurora, Mulan, and Phillip, along with Regina/Evil Queen's mother Cora and Captain Hook. The latter two follow Emma and Mary Margaret as they successfully make it back to Storybrooke, with Cora wanting to get even with Regina, and Hook wanting to kill "the Crocodile" (Rumplestiltskin) for taking his hand and his lover. Meanwhile, Rumpelstiltskin works to bypass the protective boundary and leave Storybrooke to find his missing son Bae, discovering that Bae is actually Henry's father Neal. The magical boundary of Storybrooke starts to falter, allowing strangers inside Storybrooke, including outsiders Greg Mendell and Tamara, both secretly working for a mysterious organization tracking and eliminating magic around the world, with their actions leading to Henry's captivity in Neverland, setting up the third season.

Cast and characters

Main
 Ginnifer Goodwin as Snow White / Mary Margaret Blanchard
 Jennifer Morrison as Emma Swan
 Lana Parrilla as Evil Queen / Regina Mills
 Josh Dallas as Prince Charming / David Nolan
 Emilie de Ravin as Belle / Lacey
 Jared S. Gilmore as Henry Mills
 Meghan Ory as Red Riding Hood / Ruby
 Robert Carlyle as Rumplestiltskin / Mr. Gold
 Colin O'Donoghue as Captain Hook / Killian Jones

Recurring

 Lee Arenberg as Grumpy / Leroy
 Michael Raymond-James as Baelfire / Neal Cassidy
 Beverley Elliott as Widow Lucas / Granny
 Barbara Hershey as Cora / Queen of Hearts
 Jeffrey Kasier as Dopey
 Michael Coleman as Happy
 Mig Macario as Bashful
 Faustino Di Bauda as Sleepy / Walter
 David Paul Grove as Doc
 Sarah Bolger as Aurora
 Ethan Embry as Owen Flynn / Greg Mendell
 Jamie Chung as Hua Mulan
 Keegan Connor Tracy as The Blue Fairy / Mother Superior
 Raphael Sbarge as Jiminy Cricket / Dr. Archie Hopper
 Sonequa Martin-Green as Tamara
 David Anders as Dr. Victor Frankenstein / Dr. Whale
 Gabe Khouth as Sneezy / Tom Clark
 Tony Amendola as Geppetto / Marco
 Chris Gauthier as Mr. Smee
 Alan Dale as King George / Albert Spencer
 Jorge Garcia as Anton
 Sebastian Stan as The Mad Hatter / Jefferson
 Julian Morris as Prince Phillip

Guest

 Bailee Madison as Young Snow White
 Rachel Shelley as Milah
 Eion Bailey as August Booth / Pinocchio
 Tony Perez as Henry
 Dylan Schmidt as Young Baelfire
 Jamie Dornan as Huntsman / Sheriff Graham Humbert
 Tom Ellis as Robin Hood
 Freya Tingley as Wendy Darling
 Parker Croft as Felix
 Gabrielle Rose as Ruth
 Eric Keenleyside as Sir Maurice / Moe French
 Noah Bean as Daniel Colter
 Rose McGowan as Young Cora
 Sinqua Walls as Sir Lancelot
 Annabeth Gish as Anita
 Ben Hollingsworth as Quinn
 Gregory Itzin as Alphonse Frankenstein
 Chad Michael Collins as Gerhardt Frankenstein
 Cassidy Freeman as Jack
 Lesley Nicol as Johanna
 Rena Sofer as Queen Eva
 Joaquim de Almeida as King Xavier
 John Pyper-Ferguson as Kurt Flynn
 Benjamin Stockham as Young Owen Flynn
 Tzi Ma as the Dragon
 Wil Traval as Sheriff of Nottingham / Keith

Episodes

Production

Development
On May 10, 2012, ABC ordered Once Upon a Time for a second season, which premiered on September 30, 2012.

Co-creators Adam Horowitz and Edward Kitsis spoke about the repercussions of the first season finale's events, stating, "Magic as we know always comes with a price and we are introducing it to a world where it has never been before and I think that’s going to have unpredictable results. It’s going to affect everybody this season because that’s what’s more fun." said Kitsis. On everyone in Storybrooke's memories returning Horowitz commented, "One of the things that’s interesting to us to explore is this notion that just because the memories have returned does not mean that the past 28 years did not happen. Those memories, the Davids, the Mary Margarets, the Mr. Golds, all those people, who they were existed and what they did actually happened and those are the things that will have to be dealt with."

The show still bounced back-and-forth between the fairy-tale world and Storybrooke, although there were slight differences compared to season one. It was hinted that another form of narrative was introduced during the season.

Casting
In June 2012, it was reported that season one recurring actresses Meghan Ory (Red Riding Hood/Ruby) and Emilie de Ravin (Belle/Lacey) had both been promoted to series regulars for the second season. In July 2012, it was announced that Pretty Little Liars star Julian Morris would be guest starring as Prince Phillip, an altruistic hero and adept warrior, while Teen Wolf actor Sinqua Walls was cast as Sir Lancelot, a former member of the round table. In the same month, it was announced that The Tudors star Sarah Bolger and The Hangover Part II actress Jamie Chung had joined the recurring cast as Princess Aurora (Sleeping Beauty) and Chinese warrior Mulan. On August 3, 2012, The Rite actor Colin O'Donoghue booked the recurring role of Captain Killian "Hook" Jones, the prime antagonist of J. M. Barrie's Peter Pan. O'Donoghue joined the main cast during the second half of the season. The same day, it was reported that True Blood's Michael Raymond-James had joined the season's recurring cast in an unknown role, described only as "mysterious". This was later revealed to be Neal Cassidy (Rumplestiltskin's son Baelfire, Emma Swan's ex-boyfriend and Henry Mills' father). Lost alum Jorge Garcia recurs as Anton the Giant, referenced from Jack and the Beanstalk. Garcia was originally scheduled to appear in only one episode, but his character was later expanded. Actor Raphael Sbarge, who portrays Jiminy Cricket, was made part of the recurring guest cast this season, as opposed to being included in the first season's main cast. The L Word actress Rachel Shelley played the recurring role of Milah, Rumplestiltskin's wife. Eureka actor Christopher Gauthier is recurring throughout the season as Mr. William Smee, Captain Hook's right-hand-man. In October 2012, Can't Hardly Wait star Ethan Embry joined the recurring cast as an unknown visitor to Storybrooke. Eion Bailey (Pinocchio/August Booth) made guest appearances in episodes six and 18. Tony Perez (Prince Henry) and Alan Dale (King George/Albert Spencer) both made recurring appearances in some capacity throughout the season.

Actor Noah Bean reprised his role as Daniel, the Evil Queen's love-interest, during episode five, "The Doctor". The X-Files actress Annabeth Gish guest starred as Anita, the leader of a pack of werewolves, in Child of the Moon. The Christmas Card actor Chad Michael Collins and 24 veteran Gregory Itzin appeared in In the Name of the Brother as Gerhardt/Frankenstein's Monster, Dr. Frankenstein's younger brother and as Alphonse, the boys' father, respectively. Scream and Charmed actress Rose McGowan portrayed a young Cora in The Miller's Daughter. Lesley Nicol, of Downton Abbey fame, was cast as Johanna in The Queen is Dead which also featured Heroes vet Rena Sofer as Queen Eva, Snow White's mother. It was implicated that the role has the potential to become recurring. Caprica actor John Pyper-Ferguson guest starred in Welcome to Storybrooke as Kurt Flynn, a widower who longs to aid his son after experiencing the loss of his mother. Season one co-star Jamie Dornan also reprised his role as Sheriff Graham Humbert in the episode.

Since the first season, Kings actor Sebastian Stan had portrayed Jefferson/The Mad Hatter in a recurring role; he has since departed from the show with obligations to the Broadway play Picnic and his role as Bucky Barnes/Winter Soldier in the Marvel Cinematic Universe. It was reported that ABC was set to recast the role with the potential for a possible spin-off based on the character. However, Stan's recasting was repudiated by series co-creator Adam Horowitz, saying that Stan "is a very busy man, I don't know when he will be making his way back toward us". He later confirmed that Stan would not be returning to the series in 2013.

Filming
Principal photography for the season began in Vancouver, British Columbia on July 16, 2012 and completed on April 5, 2013. The town of Steveston doubles as Storybrooke for the series.

Ratings

Soundtrack

Home video releases

Notes

References

External links

2012 American television seasons
2013 American television seasons
Season 2